Luis Ángel Vildozo (born 9 December 1981) is an Argentine former professional footballer who played as a forward.

Vildozo retired from professional football on 20 July 2019.

Honours

Club

Unión San Felipe
Primera B : 2009
Copa Chile: 2009

References

External links

1981 births
Living people
Argentine footballers
Argentine expatriate footballers
All Boys footballers
C.D. Olmedo footballers
Aldosivi footballers
Unión Española footballers
Unión San Felipe footballers
Club Atlético Colegiales (Argentina) players
Club Comunicaciones footballers
Chilean Primera División players
Categoría Primera A players
Primera B Metropolitana players
Argentine Primera División players
Primera Nacional players
Expatriate footballers in Chile
Expatriate footballers in Ecuador
Sportspeople from San Juan Province, Argentina
Association football forwards
People from San Juan, Argentina
Argentine expatriate sportspeople in Ecuador
Argentine expatriate sportspeople in Chile